Raceview Football Club is a junior-level club playing in the Ballymena Saturday Morning League in Northern Ireland. The club dropped into junior football from Intermediate Football for the 2013-14 season, after dissolving back to one team from two and reclaiming their place in BSML top division the club is once again moving strength to strength. Raceview previously enjoyed intermediate status and participation in the Irish Cup. One of the Clubs greatest achievements comes back in 2002 in winning the County Antrim FA Junior shield. in 2021 the club has now expanded to having a women's team Raceview FC Ladies which in the 2022 was detracted to be part of the NIWFA and will compete for the first time in the 2022 season.

Honours

Junior Honours

Co. Antrim Junior Shield: 1

BSML Division 1: 4

BSML Division 2: 1

BSML Division 3: 1

Okane Cup: 3

Top 4 Cup: 4

Rainey Cup: 3

Ace Cup: 2

Intermediate honours
Ballymena & Provincial Intermediate League: 5

Crawford Cup: 2

O'gorman Cup: 3

External links
 nifootball.co.uk - (For fixtures, results and tables of all Northern Ireland amateur football leagues)

Association football clubs in Northern Ireland
Association football clubs in County Antrim